Erdzhanik Avetisyan (born December 7, 1969, in Aygezard, Armenia) is an Armenian-Russian sport shooter, specializing in the skeet shootings event.

Avetisyan first started shooting as a 16-year-old.

Avetisyan competed at the 2000 Summer Olympics, at which she placed sixth in the women's skeet event. She also won the 1999 World Shotgun Championships, 2006 World Shooting Championships and 2007 World Cup in women's skeet.

References 

1969 births
Living people
Russian female sport shooters
Skeet shooters
Shooters at the 2000 Summer Olympics
Olympic shooters of Russia
Russian people of Armenian descent